Robert Carnegie may refer to:

 Robert Carnegie, Lord Kinnaird (died 1566), Scottish landowner and judge
 Robert Carnegie, 13th Earl of Northesk (1926–1994), British landowner and farmer
 Robert Carnegie, 3rd Earl of Southesk (died 1688), Scottish nobleman